Michael Müller (born 16 August 1989) is a German former professional footballer who played as a goalkeeper.

References

External links

1989 births
Living people
German footballers
Association football goalkeepers
3. Liga players
SC Freiburg players
1. FC Saarbrücken players
VfL Wolfsburg II players
Offenburger FV players